Dinedor Camp is an Iron Age hillfort, about  west of the village of Dinedor and about  south of Hereford in England. It is a scheduled monument.

In 2016, Dinedor Camp was acquired by Dinedor Parish Council, as a Community Asset Transfer from Herefordshire Council.

Description
The fort is on a spur of Dinedor Hill; it overlooks to the east the River Wye at the confluence with the River Lugg.

There is an out-turned entrance at the east.

There was some excavation in 1951 at the north-east of the fort, a trench being cut from the edge of the rampart for about  towards the centre of the camp. Sherds of Iron Age and Roman pottery, part of an iron axehead and other iron fragments were found.

See also
 Hillforts in Britain

References

External links
 Dinedor Camp at The Megalithic Portal

Hill forts in Herefordshire
Scheduled monuments in Herefordshire